West Branch Township is a township in Marion County, Kansas, United States.  As of the 2010 census, the township population was 966, including the city of Goessel.

Geography

Cities and towns
The township contains the following settlements:
 City of Goessel.

Cemeteries
The township contains the following cemeteries:
 Emmethal Community Cemetery, located in Section 29 T29S R1E.
 General Conference of Mennonite Church of North America Cemetery, located in Section 27 T21S R1E.
 Goessel Cemetery (1 block south of Main St on Cedar St), located in Section 5 T21S R1E.
 Goessel Mennonite Brethren Cemetery, located in Section 8 T21S R1E. 
 Greenfield Cemetery ( Greunfeld Cemetery), located in Section 16 T21S R1E.
 Schoenthal Cemetery, located in Section 35 T21S R1E.
 Tabor Mennonite Cemetery, located in Section 21 T21S R1E.
 Green Valley Cemetery (a.k.a. Quiring Cemetery) (a.k.a. West Branch Gravesite), located in Section 11 T21S R1E.
 Heibert Farm Cemetery, located in Section 27 T21S R1E.
 Voth Cemetery, located in Section 1 T21S R1E.
 Unknown Cemetery (no longer in use), located in Section 36 T21S R1E.

Transportation
K-15 highway passes north to south through the township.

References

Further reading

External links
 Marion County website
 City-Data.com
 Marion County maps: Current, Historic, KDOT

Townships in Marion County, Kansas
Townships in Kansas